Freienstein is a German language habitational surname. Notable people with the name include:
 Raphael Freienstein (1991), German former cyclist
 Thomas Freienstein (1960), German former cyclist

References 

German-language surnames
German toponymic surnames